Sir Alexander Gilmour, 3rd Baronet (c. 1737 – 1792), of Craigmillar, Edinburgh was a Member of Parliament for Edinburghshire in 12 January 1761 – 1774.

References

  

1737 births
1792 deaths
British MPs 1761–1768
British MPs 1768–1774
Members of the Parliament of Great Britain for Scottish constituencies
Baronets in the Baronetage of Nova Scotia